Julio Prieto Martín (born 21 November 1960) is a Spanish former footballer who played as a midfielder.

During a 14-year professional career he played 305 La Liga matches over 11 seasons (32 goals), mainly in representation of Atlético Madrid.

Club career
Born in Madrid, Prieto played mainly for hometown club Atlético Madrid during his professional career. After spending one season with the reserves in Segunda División and another on loan to CD Castellón, in La Liga (with relegation), he returned to the Colchoneros, being a starter for much of his five-year spell.

In the 1982–83 campaign, Prieto had his best year at Atlético with seven goals in 32 games in an eventual third-place finish. After helping them to two major titles he was part of the team that reached the final of the 1986 UEFA Cup Winners' Cup, appearing in the decisive match against FC Dynamo Kyiv (0–3 loss).

Prieto signed for RC Celta de Vigo in summer 1987, playing (104 of his 107 appearances were starts) and scoring regularly for the Galicians but suffering top-flight relegation in his third and final year. He returned to Atlético Madrid for 1990–91, but was only a fringe player in his third spell.

After two seasons in the second level with CP Mérida, Prieto retired from football at nearly 35 with Talavera CF, in Segunda División B.

Honours
Atlético Madrid
Copa del Rey: 1984–85, 1990–91
Supercopa de España: 1985
UEFA Cup Winners' Cup: Runner-up 1985–86

References

External links

Celta de Vigo biography 

1960 births
Living people
Footballers from Madrid
Spanish footballers
Association football midfielders
La Liga players
Segunda División players
Segunda División B players
Atlético Madrid B players
Atlético Madrid footballers
CD Castellón footballers
RC Celta de Vigo players
CP Mérida footballers
Talavera CF players
Spain youth international footballers
Spain under-21 international footballers